Elachista atricomella is a moth of the family Elachistidae that is found in Europe.

Description
The head is blackish, whitish sprinkled,
face in female whitish. Forewings blackish, pale sprinkled; a somewhat oblique fascia before middle, in male interrupted, a tornal spot, and a larger triangular spot beyond it on costa white. Hindwings are dark grey.The larva is pale yellowish ; head pale brown ; 2 with two yellow brown marks.

The moth flies from May to September depending on the location.

The larvae mines the leaves of cock's-foot (Dactylis glomerata). Larvae regularly vacate the mine and begin elsewhere. Pupation takes place outside of the mine. Larvae can be found from late autumn to May. They are greenish yellow with a light brown head.

Distribution
The moth is found in most of Europe, except the Iberian Peninsula, Balkan Peninsula and the Mediterranean Islands.

References

External links
 Plant Parasites of Europe

atricomella
Leaf miners
Moths described in 1849
Moths of Europe
Taxa named by Henry Tibbats Stainton